Vellaatt Chembalancheri Balakrishna Panicker (1 March 1889 – 20 October 1912) was a journalist and poet who wrote several poems, slokas, plays, articles and translations, such as his elegy or lament Oru Vilapam and a description of nature Viswaroopam for which he is remembered. He was the author of Manki Geetha

Biography 

V.C. Balakrishna Panicker was born on 1 March 1889 at Oorakam-Keezhmuri near Malappuram. He was born in a poor family but went to Mankavu Palace in Kozhikode, where he stayed for 4 years amongst other poets and authors.

He wrote a well-known editorial on 26 October 1910 against the externment of Swadeshabhimani Ramakrishna Pillai.

V.C. died of tuberculosis at the early age of 23 on 20 October 1912.

References 

1889 births
1912 deaths
People from Malappuram district
Journalists from Kerala
Indian newspaper editors
Indian independence activists from Kerala
Poets from Kerala
20th-century Indian poets
20th-century Indian journalists
Indian male poets
Indian male journalists
20th-century Indian male writers